The men's sabre was a fencing event held as part of the Fencing at the 1920 Summer Olympics programme. It was the sixth appearance of the event. A total of 43 fencers from 9 nations competed in the event, which was held on August 25 and August 26, 1920. Nations were limited to eight fencers each. The event was won by Nedo Nadi of Italy, one of his five gold medals in 1920. His brother Aldo Nadi took silver. Adrianus de Jong of the Netherlands finished third. They were the first medals in the individual men's sabre for both countries. This was the only time from 1908 to 1964 that Hungary did not win the men's sabre—with no Hungarian fencers competing after the nation was disinvited after World War I.

Background

This was the sixth appearance of the event, which is the only fencing event to have been held at every Summer Olympics. Seven of the eight finalists from 1912 had been Hungarian; with Hungary not invited to the 1920 Games in the aftermath of World War I, none of those seven could return. The other finalist, however, was Nedo Nadi of Italy—the heavy favorite with no Hungarians competing (and with 1919 Inter-Allied champion Vincent Gillens of Belgium not attending either).

Czechoslovakia made its debut in the men's sabre. Italy and Denmark each made their fourth appearance in the event, tying Austria (also not invited to the Games following the war) for most of any nation.

Competition format

The event used a three-round format. In each round, the fencers were divided into pools to play a round-robin within the pool. Bouts were to three touches (an unpopular change from the more typical five). Standard sabre rules were used, including that the target area was the now-standard target above the waist (in contrast to the larger target in 1912 and the whole body in 1896, 1900, and 1908).
 Quarterfinals: There were 5 pools of between 7 and 9 fencers each. The top 4 fencers in each quarterfinal advanced to the semifinals, except that the top 5 in quarterfinal C advanced (with two men tied for fourth, the tie was not broken and both advanced).
 Semifinals: There were 3 pools of 7 fencers each. The top 4 fencers in each semifinal advanced to the final.
 Final: The final pool had 12 fencers.

Schedule

Results

Quarterfinals

Quarterfinal A

Quarterfinal B

Quarterfinal C

Quarterfinal D

Quarterfinal E

Semifinals

Semifinal A

Semifinal B

Semifinal C

Final

References

 
 

Fencing at the 1920 Summer Olympics